The men's tournament of the 2014 FIBA 3x3 World Championships hosted in Russia was contested by 24 teams.

Participating teams
All five FIBA zones were represented. The top 24 teams, including the hosts, based on the FIBA National Federation ranking qualified for the tournament.

FIBA Asia (4)
  (21)
  (20)
  (12)
  (23)

FIBA Africa (1)
  (24)

FIBA Oceania (1)
  (19)

FIBA Americas (6)
 (18)
 (3)
 (22)
 (14)
 (9)
 (15)

FIBA Europe (12)
 (13)
 (17)
 (11)
 (8)
 (7)
 (16)
 (1)
 (2)
 (10) (hosts)
 (5)
 (4)
 (6)

Preliminary round

Pool A

|

|

|}

Notes
: Poland–Czech Republic 22–21

Pool B

|

|

|}
Notes
: Romania–Russia 19–17

Pool C

|

|

|}
Notes
: Uruguay–New Zealand 16–15

Pool D

|

|

|}
Source:FIBA

Knockout stage

Awards

Dunk contest
The Dunk Contest also called Nike Dunk Contest due to sponsorship reasons, was held from 7–8 June 2014. Each team can enter 1 player to participate in the dunk contest. There are two phases, the qualification and the final, which consists of the semi-finals and final). Each player has three attempts to complete both a first and a second dunk which was graded by members of the jury (0 or 5-10). 7 players entered to the competition.
Qualification

Final Standing
''After the Final held on 8 June 2014.

References

Men's tournament
2014 in men's sport